The Groppo XL and Groppo Trail are very similar single engine, tandem seat, high wing ultralight aircraft designed and built in Italy. Both can be supplied complete or in kit form.  The two models differ chiefly in undercarriage type.

Design and development

Apart from their undercarriage configurations, the XL (tricycle) and Trail (tailwheel) are essentially the same aircraft, with common layout, aerodynamics, dimensions and engine choices.  The high wings have constant chord and blunt tips.  They are braced to the lower fuselage with a single lift strut on each side. The ailerons are piano hinged, with plain flaps inboard.  Fin and rudder are straight edged and swept but the cantilever horizontal surfaces are rectangular; the port elevator carries a trim tab. Both wing and tailplane can be folded back for transport, the wings rotating by 90° about their axis to lie alongside the fuselage. The wings are made from aluminium.

The flat sided fuselage is built around a welded chrome-molybdenum steel frame which is skinned with riveted metal. A composite cowling covers the flat-four engine which may be a  Rotax 912UL, Sauer S 2400 UL, Sauer S 2200 UL a Jabiru 2200, Westlake A80 or other engine of similar power, driving a GT two-blade propeller.  The cockpit seats two in tandem under the wing, with a transparency built into the leading edge for a better upward view from the front seat. There is a wide, upward hinged, starboard side glazed door for access into both seats.  There is a rear-view transparency in the fairing behind the accommodation, over the tapered fuselage.

The Trail has a fixed tailwheel undercarriage, with the mainwheels mounted onto the lower fuselage on cantilever aluminium spring legs. Ground steering is by differential hydraulic brakes.  Larger wheels are an option for rough ground operation. The XL has similarly sprung mainwheels, though mounted further aft and in fairings. Its nosewheel is also faired.

The Trail is derived from the XL and made its first appearance at AERO Friedrichshafen in April 2009, though it is not known if it had then already flown.

Operational history

50 Trails had been built by the end of 2010. UK marketing began that year and one aircraft was UK registered in December 2010.

Specifications (Rotax 912 engine)

References

External links

 Groppo Trail: Italy’s Affordable LSA review on AVweb

2000s Italian sport aircraft
High-wing aircraft
Single-engined tractor aircraft
Aircraft first flown in 2009